John Requa (born January 1, 1967) is an American screenwriter (with Glenn Ficarra) of Cats & Dogs, Bad Santa and the 2005 remake Bad News Bears.

The DVD commentary for Bad News Bears revealed that Requa was to have had a bit role in the film, but it was not shot.

Requa and Ficarra directed Jim Carrey and Ewan McGregor in their screenplay I Love You Phillip Morris. For their writing on this film, Requa and Ficarra received a nomination for the Writers Guild of America Award for Best Adapted Screenplay.

Early life
Requa grew up in Burien, Washington, a suburb of Seattle, graduating from Burien's Highline High School in 1985. His talents as a writer were evident when he wrote and performed in a skit for his senior year Homecoming assembly titled "Fernbusters." It was a morphing of Ghostbusters and the Christmas Trees sketch from Saturday Night Live. In it, Requa played the killer fern. For another assembly later that year he wrote a skit about an almighty creator named Sven.

Requa attended Highline at the same time as Dana Newton, who became a senior producer on The Oprah Winfrey Show, Randy Dixon who is an internationally known improv artist who heads Unexpected Productions in Seattle, and Mike Starr who was the original Bassist for Alice in Chains and seen on season three of Celebrity Rehab with Dr. Drew.

Requa graduated from the film program at the Pratt Institute in the early 90s. While there he met and began his long association with writing partner Glenn Ficarra.

Professional career
As best as is known, all of John Requa's professional work has been in association with his writing partner Glenn Ficarra.

Requa and Ficarra wrote numerous episodes of The Angry Beavers, an animated series on Nickelodeon from 1997 until 2001.  Their first episode was season two's Kandid Kreatures which they followed with Dag for Night, Un-Barry-ble, Zooing Time, Sans-a-Pelt and Gonna Getcha.  They went on to write eleven more episodes over the remaining three seasons of the show.

The pair directed Focus, starring Will Smith and Margot Robbie, and Whiskey Tango Foxtrot, starring Tina Fey and Robbie. More recently, his Zaftig company signed a deal with Fox Entertainment.

Filmography

Film

Executive producer
 Storks (2016)
 DC League of Super-Pets (2022)

Television

References

External links

1967 births
Living people
American male screenwriters
Pratt Institute alumni
People from Burien, Washington
Film directors from Washington (state)
Screenwriters from Washington (state)
Highline High School alumni